Diplacus viscidus is a species of monkeyflower known by the common name sticky monkeyflower.

Distribution
Diplacus viscidus is endemic to the western Sierra Nevada foothills of California, where it grows in bare and disturbed habitat, such as areas recently cleared by wildfire.

Description
Diplacus viscidus is a hairy annual herb growing 2 to 37 centimeters tall. The oval or oblong leaves reach up to 4.5 centimeters long. The tubular base of the flower is encapsulated in a swollen, ribbed calyx of hairy sepals with pointed lobes.

The flower corolla is one to two centimeters long and lavender to magenta in color, with yellow stripes and darker spotting inside the hairy mouth.

References

External links
Jepson Manual Treatment —  Mimulus viscidus
USDA Plants Profile: Mimulus viscidus
Mimulus viscidus — Photo gallery

viscidus
Endemic flora of California
Flora of the Sierra Nevada (United States)
Natural history of the California chaparral and woodlands
Flora without expected TNC conservation status